Quézac is a former commune in the Lozère department in southern France. On 1 January 2017, it was merged into the new commune Gorges du Tarn Causses. Its population was 326 in 2019.

See also
Communes of the Lozère department

References

Former communes of Lozère